David Douglas is an American professional mixed martial artist and boxer. A professional MMA competitor since 2004, he has competed for Strikeforce, EliteXC, and ShoXC.

Background
Douglas was born and raised in the heart of a rough neighborhood in Antioch, California, along with his twin brother Damion, by their parents who worked for steel mills. The Douglas brothers got into many fights while growing up, beating up schoolyard bullies that were bigger and older than themselves. Both of them began learning the martial arts from a young age and were taught at home by their father, Danny, who was a black belt in Tae Kwon Do.

Mixed martial arts career

Early career
After a 3-1 start to his professional career, Douglas was signed by EliteXC in 2008.

Strikeforce
Douglas made his debut for Strikeforce in August 2009 on the preliminary card of Strikeforce: Carano vs. Cyborg, losing to Justin Wilcox via submission.

He returned to the organization in 2010 on their ShoMMA Strikeforce Challengers series. He defeated Dominic Clark via TKO in October 2010 and Nick Gonzalez via submission in February 2011.

He next fought Caros Fodor at Strikeforce Challengers: Wilcox vs. Damm and lost in the third round by TKO.

Professional boxing
Douglas made his professional boxing debut in 2016 against Jasper McCargo, losing via third round knockout.

Douglas returned to the ring in 2019 against 3-0 Chris Washington. He was defeated via first-round knockout.

Personal life
Douglas got his nickname "Tarzan" from Cesar Gracie while training together, due to his long hair and lanky build. David's twin brother, Damion Douglas, is also a mixed martial artist who competed for Strikeforce. David has two children, while Damion has three.

Mixed martial arts record

|-
|Loss
|align=center|10-12
|Serob Minasyan
|TKO (punches)
|UNF 4
|
|align=center|2
|align=center|4:55
|Commerce, California, United States
|
|-
|Loss
|align=center|10–11
|Eugene Correa
|Submission (heel hook)
|Urijah Faber's A1 Combat 6
|
|align=center|1
|align=center|0:18
|Commerce, California, United States
|
|-
| Loss
| align=center| 10–10
| Migran Arutyunyan
| TKO (punches)
| UNF 2
| 
| align=center| 1
| align=center| 2:54
|Commerce, California, United States
|Return to Lightweight.
|-
| Loss
| align=center| 10–9
| Richard LeRoy
| TKO (punches)
| Celtic Gladiator 21
| 
| align=center| 1
| align=center| 3:45
| Burbank, California, United States
|Catchweight (165 lbs) bout.
|-
| Win
| align=center| 10–8
| D.J. Roberson
| TKO (punches)
| Gladiator Challenge: Holiday Beatings
| 
| align=center| 1
| align=center| 0:22
| Lincoln, California, United States
|Welterweight bout.
|-
| Loss
| align=center| 10–7
| Eldon Sproat	
| TKO (punches)
| X-1 World Events 48.5
| 
| align=center| 2
| align=center| 3:04
| Honolulu, Hawaii, United States
|For the X-1 Middleweight Championship.
|-
| Loss
| align=center| 9–7
| Chris Hofmann	
| TKO (punches)
| URCC 29: Conquest
| 
| align=center| 1
| align=center| N/A
| San Francisco, California, United States
|For the URCC Middleweight Championship.
|-
| Win
| align=center| 9–6
| DeMarco Villalona	
| TKO (punches)
| Dragon House 22
| 
| align=center| 1
| align=center| 1:00
| San Francisco, California, United States
|Middleweight debut.
|-
| Loss
| align=center| 8–6
| Ray Cooper III
| TKO (punches)
| Star Elite Cage Fighting
| 
| align=center| 1
| align=center| 0:27
| Waipahu, Hawaii, United States
|Welterweight bout.
|-
| Loss
| align=center| 8–5
| Ousmane Thomas Diagne
| KO (punch)
| Red Canvas: Art of Submission 3
| 
| align=center| 1
| align=center| 3:03
| Stockton, California, United States
| 
|-
| Loss
| align=center| 8–4
| Felipe Olivieri
| TKO (knee and punches)
| Wreck MMA: Road to Glory
| 
| align=center| 1
| align=center| 2:54
| Gatineau, Quebec, Canada
| 
|-
| Loss
| align=center| 8–3
| Caros Fodor
| TKO (strikes)
| Strikeforce Challengers: Wilcox vs. Damm
| 
| align=center| 3
| align=center| 2:12
| Stockton, California, United States
| 
|-
| Win
| align=center| 8–2
| Nick Gonzalez
| Technical Submission (rear-naked choke)
| Strikeforce Challengers: Beerbohm vs. Healy
| 
| align=center| 1
| align=center| 1:05
| Cedar Park, Texas, United States
|Catchweight (150 lbs) bout.
|-
| Win
| align=center| 7–2
| Dominic Clark
| TKO (punches)
| Strikeforce Challengers: Bowling vs. Voelker
| 
| align=center| 2
| align=center| 2:33
| Fresno, California, United States
| 
|-
| Loss
| align=center| 6–2
| Justin Wilcox
| Submission (rear-naked choke)
| Strikeforce: Carano vs. Cyborg
| 
| align=center| 3
| align=center| 3:16
| San Jose, California, United States
| 
|-
| Win
| align=center| 6–1
| Malaipet
| TKO (punches)
| ShoXC: Elite Challenger Series
| 
| align=center| 3
| align=center| 2:51
| Santa Ynez, California, United States
| 
|-
| Win
| align=center| 5–1
| William Jacobson
| TKO (corner stoppage)
| ShoXC: Hamman vs. Suganuma II
| 
| align=center| 1
| align=center| 1:12
| Friant, California, United States
| 
|-
| Win
| align=center| 4–1
| Marlon Mathias
| TKO (punches)
| EliteXC: Unfinished Business
| 
| align=center| 1
| align=center| 0:12
| Stockton, California, United States
|Lightweight debut.
|-
| Win
| align=center| 3–1
| Yusuke Ikenishi
| TKO (doctor stoppage)
| CCFC: Total Elimination
| 
| align=center| 3
| align=center| N/A
| Santa Rosa, California, United States
| 
|-
| Loss
| align=center| 2–1
| Jeff Curran
| Submission (rear-naked choke)
| IFC: Eve Of Destruction
| 
| align=center| 1
| align=center| 1:39
| Salt Lake City, Utah, United States
|Featherweight debut.
|-
| Win
| align=center| 2–0
| Joe Martin
| TKO (corner stoppage)
| IFC: Night of the Warriors 5
| 
| align=center| 1
| align=center| 0:46
| Susanville, California, United States
| 
|-
| Win
| align=center| 1–0
| Richard Savala
| TKO (punches)
| IFC: Night of the Warriors 5
| 
| align=center| 1
| align=center| 0:08
| Susanville, California, United States
|

External links

 mma-core.com

References

Living people
American male mixed martial artists
African-American mixed martial artists
Mixed martial artists from California
Lightweight mixed martial artists
Mixed martial artists utilizing taekwondo
American male taekwondo practitioners
People from Antioch, California
1982 births
21st-century African-American sportspeople
20th-century African-American people